The Turkic creation myth is an ancient story about the creation of the Gaoche (Chinese: 高車 / 高车, Pinyin: Gāochē, Wade-Giles: Kao-ch'e) (aka Tiele people) told among various Turkic peoples.

The story 
The tale is told in Chinese in the Book of Wei and the History of the Northern Dynasties

Notes

See also 

 Grey wolf (mythology)
 Turkic mythology

Turkic mythology
Creation myths